Bjarke is a Danish masculine given name. People bearing the name Bjarke include:
Bjarke Ingels (born 1974), Danish architect
Bjarke Ingels Group (BIG), Copenhagen and New York based group of architects, designers, and builders
Bjarke Mogensen (born 1985), Danish accordionist
Bjarke Møller (born 1985), Danish ice hockey player
Bjarke Refslund (born 19??), Danish mountain bike orienteer 

Danish masculine given names
Scandinavian masculine given names